Eunice Elizabeth Olsen (born 24 October 1977) is a Singaporean actress, media host, communications and media trainer, media producer, and businesswoman. She is a former Nominated Member of Parliament (NMP) in Singapore for two terms, a public speaker, and an advocate for women's empowerment.

In November 2004, Olsen was appointed as a Nominated Member of Parliament (NMP) in Singapore by President SR Nathan, making her the youngest nominated NMP up to that point at the age of 27. In 2006, she was given the Singapore Youth Award for her dedication to the community, her youth work and exhibiting an inspirational role model. In 2008, Olsen was awarded the ASEAN Youth Award and was a Young Global Leader representing Singapore at the World Economic Forum. In the 2010 Youth Olympic Games held in Singapore, she was one of the flag bearers for the Singaporean flag. She is currently a Goodwill Ambassador to the Embassy of Sweden.

Since winning Miss Universe Singapore, she has hosted TV shows for Mediacorp Singapore, including Wheel of Fortune, and Rouge. She has worked on AXN's lifestyle show The Duke. She made her acting debut in Red Thread, Channel 5's long-form English drama, and acted in Chinese drama serials. She also co-produced, researched, and acted in the 2013 film "3.50", the first joint Singapore/Cambodia production, which explores the issue of sex trafficking. In 2019, she presented "Becoming Singapore". In 2020, Olsen hosted a web documentary series to celebrate the 70th anniversary of the founding of the People's Republic of China for Mango TV.

In 2013, she founded Eunice Olsen Media (formerly House of Ou Studios), which focuses on social impact storytelling to help organizations with sustainability. She is the creator of WomenTalk.com, a program about extraordinary everyday women. In its debut season, it was nominated for an International Emmy Award (Digital Non-Fiction) and more recently awarded an Official Selection for Best Web Series at the Raindance Film Festival.

Olsen speaks on a range of topics, including women's empowerment, leadership, resilience, authentic communication, and various social issues.

Early life and education 
Olsen was born in Singapore. She's the only child of Alice Yap and Francis Olsen, an Eurasian Singaporean; her mother is Chinese, and her father is of Swedish and Portuguese descent. Olsen speaks English and Mandarin. Her parents enrolled her in Yamaha music school when she was three years old. She attended Woodlands Primary School, Singapore, St. Margaret's Secondary School, and Anglo-Chinese Junior College. Olsen completed her degree at the National University of Singapore, where she graduated with a Bachelor of Arts in Political Science and Philosophy.

Career

Miss Universe Singapore 
In 2000, Olsen won the Miss Universe Singapore pageant.

Social causes 
Her interest in "at-risk" youth began with work at the Toa Payoh Girl's Home and the Andrew and Grace Home. In 2002, she became a member of the advisory council for the People's Association's youth movement, T-Net Club (Teens Network Club). In 2001, she became a member of the Kebun Baru Youth Executive Committee. Olsen has worked with the National Volunteer and Philanthropy Centre and with Beyond Social Services' BABES program for pregnant teenagers. She promotes awareness for cervical cancer and the Singapore Red Cross. She has also been a goodwill ambassador for World Vision, Habitat for Humanity, and the Muscular Dystrophy Association of Singapore.

She created the annual All Smiles Day in 2013 as a day of respite for caregivers of the Rare Disorder Society.

Olsen has worked in rural Cambodia, building sanitation facilities for evacuated communities. She co-produced a movie about sex trafficking, titled 3.50.

She developed a feminine hygiene program, Project Precious, to educate women in rural communities. The program has been adapted for use in Cambodia, India, Nepal, and the United States.

Olsen has served as a goodwill ambassador for the Embassy of Sweden in Singapore.

Media 
In 2002, Olsen was selected to be the co-host of Singapore's version of the TV game show Wheel of Fortune. She went on to co-host three seasons of FRONT, an Arts Central production that examined Singapore's arts scene. In 2007, she was a judge on Channel 5's youth debate program, The Arena. She hosted Rouge in 2008, a talk show concerning Singaporean women, featuring a mix of celebrity interviews and real-life stories. Olsen made her English acting debut on Channel 5's first long-form English drama, Red Thread, and co-hosted a men's magazine lifestyle show on AXN, The Duke.

In August 2013, Olsen founded WomenTalkTV, an online talk show featuring extraordinary women from all over Asia. The show's goal is the social empowerment of Asian women. WomenTalkTV was nominated for an International Emmy Award in the Digital Program: Non-Fiction category in 2014. She hosted Channel NewsAsia's "Becoming Singapore", the flagship documentary for the Singapore Bicentennial in 2019. In 2020, Olsen hosted a web documentary series, Mundane Glory, which celebrated the 70th anniversary of the founding of the People's Republic of China for Mango TV.

Olsen has represented, in various capacities, commercial brands such as Omega, Motorola Electronics, Goldheart Jewelry, Redken, Nescafé Gold, Shell Petroleum Fuel Save Ambassador, BlackBerry Messenger, Physiogel, L'Oréal Lancome Genefique, The Body Shop.

Politics 
In November 2004, Olsen was appointed a Nominated Member of Parliament (NMP) in Singapore. Her main role as an NMP was to highlight issues pertaining to youth and volunteerism. In the course of her term, she touched on issues like access to public transport for the disabled, legislation for child sex tourism, enhancing supervisory guidance for voluntary welfare organisations, and sex education in schools. In the 2005 parliamentary debate on Integrated Resort, Olsen called for stronger measures to address the social problems of compulsive gambling, including mandating a loss limit for casino patrons and requiring the casino operator to provide responsible gambling counselling services. She championed inclusivity for people with disabilities and called for the captioning of the Channel 5 English news program. Olsen served two terms and remained an NMP until 2009. She did not apply for a third term in parliament.

Advisory boards 
Olsen is an advisor to Space for Humanity, a non-profit organisation headquartered in Denver, Colorado. She is currently a member of the National Museum of Singapore's advisory board and a management committee member of Club HEAL.

Author 
Olsen published the children's book "I'm a Girl. See what I can be!" in 2018, which consists of a series of poems about ten women from the video series, WomenTalk. The book is illustrated by 10 autistic Singaporean artists and designed by HATCH design.  It was successfully crowdfunded on Indiegogo.

Speaker and moderator 
Olsen has been engaged to speak globally on a wide range of topics, from women's empowerment, leadership, resilience, and various social issues. She is a keynote speaker and has spoken at international events such as the Cartier Women's Awards, the United Nations, LH Forum in France, in educational institutions around the world such as Harvard and universities in India, and various parts of Southeast Asia including Vietnam, the Philippines, and Singapore.

Olsen had also moderated various forums, and high-profile individuals such as Helle Thorning-Schmidt, the former Prime Minister of Denmark, and panelists from the Swedish Embassy's Disability Forum.

On 6 May 2020, Olsen moderated an online webinar for Médecins Sans Frontières, or Doctors Without Borders, titled "Live Chat on COVID-19: How MSF Responds to a Pandemic".

On 31 October 2020, Olsen co-hosted the first digital edition of The Purple Parade, which was streamed live on Facebook.

Music 
In university, Olsen was part of a band and was president of the Electronic Music Lab at the Centre for the Arts. In 2004, she released an album in South Korea entitled Believe.

Olsen was part of a duo called 7 States. She was joined by music producer and sound designer Rennie Gomes of Yellowbox. Together, they have written a Christmas song, produced a kids' album, and scored a short film for one of Singapore's most acclaimed film directors, Royston Tan, titled Anniversary. 7 States has also written a song titled "Light," which they dedicated to the athletes of the 2010 Singapore Youth Olympic Games. 7 States recently performed, featuring Humaa Rathor, at the "From Singapore with Love" benefit concert 2011. This was in support of World Vision's earthquake relief work in China, Myanmar, and Japan.

Personal life 
Olsen discovered through a TV program called My Roots that her great-great-grandfather Oskar Pontus Olsson was born in Röra, Orust, Sweden, in 1862. He became a sailor on ships that traveled back and forth to England. He eventually settled in Malaya around 1885 and lived in Malaya for 54 years. On 20 November 1928, he was naturalised, as Oscar Olsen, a British citizen in Singapore.

While filming a bicentennial special of Becoming Singapore, she also learned that her grandfather from her mother's side, Yap Swee Kang, was an auxiliary fire service volunteer after World War 2.

Olsen is Catholic.

Filmography

Film

Television 

Variety Show

Bibliography

Awards and accolades 
 2000 Miss Singapore Universe
 2006 Singapore Youth Award
 2008 ASEAN Youth Award

References

External links
 Official website
Eunice Olsen Media
 

1977 births
Anglo-Chinese Junior College alumni
Living people
Miss Universe 2000 contestants
Singaporean beauty pageant winners
Singaporean Nominated Members of Parliament
Singaporean people of Kristang descent
Singaporean people of Chinese descent
Singaporean people of Portuguese descent
Singaporean people of Swedish descent
Singaporean Roman Catholics
Singaporean television actresses
Singaporean television personalities
Singaporean women in politics